"If It Had Not Been For Jesus" is an American Christian hymn (or, gospel song) of unknown authorship. It was included in four hymnals published between 1905 and 1938. The title is taken from the first line of the refrain. An alternative title is the first line of the first verse, namely "I Was a Deep Dyed Sinner". The song is unusual in that it is in triple metre, with three beats to the bar. That suggests that the song may have been composed by an individual whose name has been lost, rather than being ascribable only to "traditional".

The song was recorded in 1930 for Columbia Records by Blind Willie Johnson (backing vocals and guitar) with Willie B. Harris (lead vocals), who may have been his first wife.

Recordings 

 1930Blind Willie Johnson, 10" 78prm single Columbia 14556-D 
 2004Leon Watson  on the album We Win at the End

Other songs 
 2006Irene Stevenson  on the album Como Now: The Voices of Panola Co., Miss, a different gospel song
 "If It Had Not Been (For the Lord on My Side)", one or more different gospel songs

See also 
 Goodnight, Irene, a secular song to the same tune

References 

Gospel songs
Blind Willie Johnson songs
1905 songs
Columbia Records singles
Songwriter unknown
Songs about Jesus